Queen of Temple Street is a 1990 Hong Kong film directed by Lawrence Ah Mon. It has a Category III rating in Hong Kong.

Cast and roles
 Sylvia Chang – Big Sis Wah
 Ha Ping – Older Woman
 Josephine Koo – Venus
 Kwan Hoi-Shan – Luke
 Alice Lau – Swallow
 Rain Lau – Yan
 Law Koon-Lan – Streetwalker
 Lo Lieh – Elvis
 Yuen King-Tan – Candy

Reception
The film was described by Paul Fonoroff in 1990 as "the best Cantonese movie to be produced in a long time".

10th Hong Kong Film Awards (1991)
 Best Screenplay: Chan Man Keung – won
 Best Actress: Sylvia Chang – nominated
 Best Supporting Actress: Rain Lau – won
 Best New Performer: Rain Lau – won
 Best Original Film Score: Tats Lau – nominated

See also
 Temple Street, Hong Kong

References

External links
 
 HK cinemagic entry

Hong Kong drama films
1990 films
Films directed by Lawrence Ah Mon
1990s Hong Kong films